The canton of Lumbres is a canton situated in the department of the Pas-de-Calais and in the Hauts-de-France region of northern France. The canton is organised around the town Lumbres.

Composition
At the French canton reorganisation which came into effect in March 2015, the canton was expanded from 33 to 60 communes:

Acquin-Westbécourt
Affringues
Aix-en-Ergny
Alette
Alquines
Audrehem
Avesnes
Bayenghem-lès-Seninghem
Bécourt
Beussent
Bezinghem
Bimont
Bléquin
Boisdinghem
Bonningues-lès-Ardres
Bourthes
Bouvelinghem
Campagne-lès-Boulonnais
Clenleu
Clerques
Cléty
Coulomby
Dohem
Elnes
Enquin-sur-Baillons
Ergny
Escœuilles
Esquerdes
Haut-Loquin
Herly
Hucqueliers
Humbert
Journy
Ledinghem
Leulinghem
Lumbres
Maninghem
Nielles-lès-Bléquin
Ouve-Wirquin
Parenty
Pihem
Preures
Quelmes
Quercamps
Quilen
Rebergues
Remilly-Wirquin
Rumilly
Saint-Michel-sous-Bois
Seninghem
Setques
Surques
Vaudringhem
Verchocq
Wavrans-sur-l'Aa
Wicquinghem
Wismes
Wisques
Zoteux
Zudausques

Population

See also 
Cantons of Pas-de-Calais 
Communes of Pas-de-Calais 
Arrondissements of the Pas-de-Calais department

References

Lumbres